Bactrocythara labiosa is a species of sea snail, a marine gastropod mollusk in the family Mangeliidae.

Description
The length of the shell attains 7 mm.

The shell is obliquely longitudinally costate, transversely sulcate. The sulci are indistinct on the ribs. The whorls are angulated above . The color of the shell is white, with a pellucid zone below the suture.

Distribution
This species is found in the Atlantic Ocean off the Cape Verdes, West Africa, Ghana, Angola.

References

 Rolán E., 2005. Malacological Fauna From The Cape Verde Archipelago. Part 1, Polyplacophora and Gastropoda.

External links
   Bouchet P., Kantor Yu.I., Sysoev A. & Puillandre N. (2011) A new operational classification of the Conoidea. Journal of Molluscan Studies 77: 273–308
  Tucker, J.K. 2004 Catalog of recent and fossil turrids (Mollusca: Gastropoda). Zootaxa 682:1–1295.

labiosa
Molluscs of the Atlantic Ocean
Gastropods of Cape Verde
Molluscs of Angola
Invertebrates of West Africa